Adéyanjú is a name of Yoruba origin meaning "the crown or royalty is complete". Notable people with the surname include:

Iziaq Adeyanju (born 1959), Nigerian sprinter
Victor Adeyanju (born 1983), American football player

Yoruba-language surnames